Pomatoschistus montenegrensis is a species of goby endemic to Montenegro where it is known to occur in the Morača River and the Zeta and also in a natural channel in Lake Skadar which connects it with Lake Malo Blato.  This species occurs in river shallows and pools with gravel substrates on which fine sediment has accumulated and filamentous algae has grown in which these fish hide.  Males of this species can reach a length of  while females only reach .

References

montenegrensis
Freshwater fish of Europe
Endemic fauna of Montenegro
Fish described in 2008